A Portrait of Thelonious is a studio album by jazz pianist Bud Powell, released on Columbia in 1965, featuring a session recorded at Studio Charlot in Paris on December 17, 1961, with Pierre Michelot on bass and Kenny Clarke on drums. The session was the second of two produced by Cannonball Adderley with Powell, following the A Tribute to Cannonball session recorded two days earlier.

The album was digitally remastered and re-released on CD in 1997 with one additional take and without the fake applause added to the original LP.

History
The album features four Monk compositions, only one of which had previously been recorded by Powell, and the album fittingly begins with this: "Off Minor", a song that Powell included in his first session as leader (see Bud Powell Trio), recorded in January 1947 – its first ever recording, since Monk himself only recorded it in October the same year (see Genius of Modern Music).

Track listing
All songs were written by Thelonious Monk, except where noted.
"Off Minor" – 5:20
"There Will Never Be Another You" (Harry Warren, Mack Gordon) – 4:17
"Ruby, My Dear" – 5:46
"No Name Blues" (Earl Bostic) – 6:38

"Thelonious" – 3:46
"Monk's Mood" – 7:06
"I Ain't Fooling" (Charles Albertine) – 3:19
"Squatty" (Brian Fahey) – 5:48
"Squatty" [unissued alternate] (Fahey) – 5:04 (not on original LP)

Personnel

Performance
Bud Powell – piano
Pierre Michelot – bass
Kenny Clarke – drums

Production
Cannonball Adderley – producer
Orrin Keepnews – liner notes, reissue producer
Nica de Koenigswarter – cover art
Dan Morgenstern – liner notes (original LP)
Mark Wilder – remastering

References

Bud Powell albums
1961 albums
Columbia Records albums
Albums produced by Cannonball Adderley
Albums produced by Orrin Keepnews
Thelonious Monk tribute albums
Thelonious Monk